Sonia Mansour (born 6 September 1988) is a Paralympian athlete from Tunisia competing mainly in category T38 sprint events.

She competed in the 2008 Summer Paralympics in Beijing, China.  There she won a silver medal in the women's 100 metres - T38 event and a silver medal in the women's 200 metres - T38 event

External links 
 

Paralympic athletes of Tunisia
Athletes (track and field) at the 2008 Summer Paralympics
Athletes (track and field) at the 2012 Summer Paralympics
Paralympic silver medalists for Tunisia
Living people
1988 births
Tunisian female sprinters
Medalists at the 2008 Summer Paralympics
Paralympic medalists in athletics (track and field)
Athletes (track and field) at the 2020 Summer Paralympics
21st-century Tunisian women